James Clarence Cohen (May 26, 1918 – April 23, 2002), nicknamed "Fireball", was an American Negro league pitcher in the 1940s and 1950s.

A native of Evergreen, Alabama, Cohen served in the US Army at Camp Lee, Virginia, during World War II. He made his Negro leagues debut in 1946 for the Indianapolis Clowns, and pitched for the team through 1952. In 1948 he was selected to play in the East–West All-Star Game. Cohen died in Washington, D.C., in 2002 at age 84.

References

External links
 and Seamheads
 Jim Cohen at Negro Leagues Baseball Museum
 James C. Cohen at Negro League Baseball Players Association

1918 births
2002 deaths
Indianapolis Clowns players
African-American baseball players
People from Evergreen, Alabama
Baseball players from Alabama
United States Army personnel of World War II
African Americans in World War II
Baseball pitchers
African-American United States Army personnel